Gęsikowo  is a settlement in the administrative district of Gmina Biskupiec, within Olsztyn County, Warmian-Masurian Voivodeship, in northern Poland.

The settlement has a population of 16.

References

Villages in Olsztyn County